A gramogram, grammagram, or letteral word is a letter or group of letters which can be pronounced to form one or more words, as in "CU" for "see you". They are a subset of rebuses, and are commonly used as abbreviations.

They are sometimes used as a component of cryptic crossword clues.

In arts and culture 

A poem reportedly appeared in the Woman's Home Companion of July 1903 using many gramograms: it was preceded by the line "ICQ out so that I can CU have fun translating the sound FX of this poem".

The Marcel Duchamp "readymade" L.H.O.O.Q. is an example of a gramogram. Those letters, pronounced in French, sound like "Elle a chaud au cul, an idiom which translates to "she has a hot ass", or in Duchamp's words "there is fire down below".

The William Steig books CDB! (1968) and CDC? (1984) use letters in the place of words. Steig has been credited as being a founder of this literary technique.

The suicide prevention charity R U OK?'s name is a gramogram, with supporters encouraged to text "R U OK?" to friends and family to see how that person's mental health is going.

A short gramogram dialogue opening with a customer asking "FUNEX" ("Have you any eggs?") appears in a 1949 book Hail fellow well met by Seymour Hicks and was expanded into a longer sketch of phrasebook-style gramogram dialogue for the comedy sketch show The Two Ronnies, under the title Swedish made simple.

The 1980s Canadian gameshow Bumper Stumpers required contestants to decode gramograms presented as fictional vanity licence plates.

See also

References

Word play
Word games